The 1987 European Amateur Team Championship took place from 24 to 28 June at Golfclub Murhof, in Frohnleiten, Austria. It was the 15th men's golf European Amateur Team Championship.

Venue 
The club was founded in 1963 and its course, located 15 kilometers north of Graz in Styria, Austria, was constructed by Dr. Bernhard von Limburger.

The championship course was set up with par 72.

Format 
Each team consisted of six players, playing two rounds of an opening stroke-play qualifying competition over two days, counting the five best scores each day for each team.

The eight best teams formed flight A, in knock-out match-play over the next three days. The teams were seeded based on their positions after the stroke play. The first placed team were drawn to play the quarter final against the eight placed team, the second against the seventh, the third against the sixth and the fourth against the fifth. Teams were allowed to use six players during the team matches, selecting four of them in the two morning foursome games and five players in to the afternoon single games. Games all square at the 18th hole were declared halved, if the team match was already decided.

The seven teams placed 9–15 in the qualification stroke-play formed flight B and the four teams placed 16–19 formed flight C, to play similar knock-out play to decide their final positions.

Teams 
19 nation teams contested the event. Each team consisted of six players.

Players in the leading teams

Other participating teams

Winners 
Team England won the opening 36-hole competition, with a score of 6 under par 714.

Individual leader was Jeremy Robinson, England, with a 6-under-par score of 138, one stroke ahead of John McHenry, Ireland. 

Team Ireland won the gold medal, earning their fourth title, beating England in the final 4.5–2.5. Team France earned the bronze on third place, after beating Sweden 5.5–1.5 in the bronze match.

Results 
Qualification round

Team standings

* Note: In the event of a tie the order was determined by the best total of the two non-counting scores of the two rounds.

Individual leaders

 Note: There was no official award for the lowest individual scores.

Flight A

Bracket

Final games

* Note: Game declared halved, since team match already decided.

Flight B

Bracket

Flight C

Final standings

Sources:

See also 
 Eisenhower Trophy – biennial world amateur team golf championship for men organized by the International Golf Federation.
 European Ladies' Team Championship – European amateur team golf championship for women organised by the European Golf Association.

References

External links 
 European Golf Association: Full results

European Amateur Team Championship
Golf tournaments in Austria
European Amateur Team Championship
European Amateur Team Championship
European Amateur Team Championship